"Nobre Vagabundo" (Portuguese for "Noble Bum" or "Noble Wanderer") is a song composed by Marcio Mello and recorded by the Brazilian singer Daniela Mercury, recorded for her fourth studio album, Feijão com Arroz.

Critic reception
The British magazine The Beat said that jewelry like "Nobre Vagabundo" fulfill what is the most mature album by Mercury. The Brazilian magazine Veja said that the track was meant to be the album's big hit. Howard J. Blumenthal, writer of the book The World Music CD Listener's Guide, said that Mercury's vocals without any instrumental was "amazing".

Formats and track listings
Portugal CD single
 Nobre Vagabundo" - 3:35

Chart performance
Following the success of "À Primeira Vista", "Nobre Vagabundo" became the second consecutive single of the album to reach No. 1 on the Billboard Hot 100 Brazil.

References

Daniela Mercury songs
1997 singles
1997 songs
Epic Records singles